Magma Pictures Ltd. is a film production company based in the United Kingdom, founded in 2004 by directors James Walker and Ed Boase who have been working together in the film industry. Magma Pictures is based in London. Magma Pictures' educational sister company is Young Film Academy. Magma Pictures specialises in feature films and corporate films.

History 

Magma Pictures' films have been shown in over fifty festivals worldwide and broadcast on BBC Four, HTV, Canal+ and Rai 1, among others. Their awards include Best UK Short (Raindance Film Festival), Cocotte-Minute Grand Prix ( Brest European Short Film Festival ) and Best Director (Capalbio International Film Festival). James Walker (director) graduated from Trinity College, Cambridge in 2001. He was nominated for the London Writer's Award in 2002 and won the King's Cross New Writing Award, 2004. He has since been commissioned by the National Theatre and is writing for television. Ed Boase (director) graduated from the London College of Printing in 2001. His latest short film Home Video was shortlisted for Best Newcomer at the Rushes Short Film Festival and won the Silver Melies award at the Leeds International Film Festival 2006. Magma Pictures' first feature film is Blooded, which received UK theatrical and DVD release in April 2011.

Films 
Magma's films include:
Blooded
Taboo
One Small Leap
Trigger
Into Swans
ctrl+z
Home Video

Awards 
Best Newcomer Rushes Short Film Festival 2006
Silver Melies Leeds International Film Festival 2006
Winner, Best UK Short, Raindance 2003
Winner, Cocotte-Minute Prix, Brest Film Festival 2003 
HTV Award, Brief Encounters 2002
Best Director, Capalbio International Film Festival 2003
F.I.C.E. Award, Capalbio International Film Festival 2003
Runner-up, Aprille Award, Milan Film Festival 2002

Screening 

Screened on BBC Four, HTV, Canal +, Rai Uno.

Blooded 

In June 2008, directors Ed Boase and James Walker completed principal photography on their first feature film, Blooded, set on the Isle of Mull in Scotland. The film, made with collaborator Nick Ashdon (Ptarmigan ACP), had a UK release on 1 April 2011 by Revolver Entertainment.

References

External links 
 Magma website

Film production companies of the United Kingdom